Istanbul Airport is the main international airport serving Istanbul, Turkey. It is located in the Arnavutköy district on the European side of the city.

All scheduled commercial passenger flights were transferred from Atatürk Airport to Istanbul Airport on 6 April 2019, following the closure of Atatürk Airport for scheduled passenger flights. The IATA airport code IST was also transferred to the new airport.

It served more than 37 million passengers in 2021, making it the busiest airport in Europe and 13th-busiest airport in the world in terms of total passenger traffic and, by serving more than 27 million international passengers, the 2nd-busiest airport in the world in terms of international passenger traffic.

History

Background 
Atatürk Airport was one of the busiest airports in Europe. Since 2013, it had ranked among the five busiest airports in Europe by passenger traffic. In 2017, Atatürk Airport and Sabiha Gökçen, Istanbul's other international airport, handled over 100 million passengers combined. By comparison, the six London-area airports serve more than 150 million passengers a year, while the three Paris-area airports serve around 100 million passengers a year.

As Atatürk Airport was hemmed in by the city on three sides and the sea of Marmara on another, it was unable to expand to meet the growing demands placed on it. Sabiha Gökçen was also at capacity. The decision was taken to build a new airport, well away from the city to ensure ample space.

Location 
The area is a  region near Lake Terkos. Some  of this area was state-owned forest. The area encompassed old open-pit coal mines, which were later filled with soil.

According to the Environmental Impact Assessment (ÇED) report published in April 2013, there were a total of 2,513,341 trees in the area and 657,950 of them would need to be cut indispensably, while 1,855,391 trees would be moved to new places. However, the Ministry of Forest and Water Management claimed the exact number of trees cut and moved would only be revealed after construction was complete.

Construction
Construction of the airport was divided over four phases. When all stages are completed, the airport will have the capacity to serve 200 million yearly passengers, which would at that time have made it the world's biggest airport. The cost of the project was estimated at €7 billion, without accounting for the cost of financing.

London-based firm Grimshaw Architects headed the design team, which mostly consisted of British architects. Others involved in the design were Norway-based Haptic Architects and Turkish architects Fonksiyon and TAM/Kiklop.

A tender was made for the construction as well as for operating the airport. Bidding for these tenders took place on 3 May 2013. Of the eligible companies, four Turkish and two foreign contenders took part in the bidding process. The Turkish joint venture consortium of Cengiz-Kolin-Limak-Mapa-Kalyon won the tender and were obliged to pay the government €26.142 billion including value-added tax for a 25-year lease starting from 2018. The completion date of the construction's first stage was officially set for 2018 – 42 months after the finalization of the tender's approval.

The groundbreaking ceremony took place on 7 June 2014, though construction only started in May 2015 after the land was officially handed over.

The inauguration of the airport took place on the planned date of 29 October 2018. It was reported that the first test landing at the airport would take place on 26 February 2018; however, the first landing took place on 20 June 2018. Testing of navigational and electronic systems with DHMİ aircraft had begun on 15 May 2018.

The control tower is in the shape of the Turkish national flower, the tulip.

Project stages
The construction of the airport is taking place in several stages, expanding the airport and its facilities over time.

The first stage consists of the main terminal, with an annual passenger capacity of 90 million and an area of  – making it the world's largest airport terminal building under a single roof, despite Dubai International Airport Terminal 3 having a larger floor area at  due to tunnels connecting its two concourses. In addition, the airport will feature three technical blocks for repairs, maintenance, and fueling, as well as an air traffic control tower, eight ramp control towers, and hangars for cargo and general aviation aircraft. Several other services are also to be in operation, including hospitals, frequent-flyer and VIP lounges, prayer rooms, convention centers, and hotels; some of these are expected to form part of the Istanbul Airport City project.

The second stage will add a third independent runway to the east of the main terminal, as well as a fourth remote runway with an east–west heading and additional taxiways and apron areas.
The final and fourth stage of expansion will, along with adding another runway, allow for the construction of satellite terminals with a combined capacity of 50 million passengers and an area of up to  if needed.

Once fully completed by 2025, the airport will have six sets of runways (eight in total), 16 taxiways, and a total annual passenger capacity of 150 million passengers. The airport will also have a  apron with a parking capacity of 500 aircraft, VIP lounges, cargo and general aviation facilities, a state palace, and indoor and outdoor parking that can accommodate up to 70,000 cars. A medical center, aircraft rescue and firefighting stations, hotels, convention centers, power plants, and wastewater treatment facilities will also be built.

Controversies 
The Turkish Chamber of Environmental Engineers (ÇMO) took the project tender to court on grounds that the project violated the existing legislation for the preparation of the Environmental Impact Assessment (ÇED) report. In February 2014, an Istanbul administrative court ordered the construction of the airport to be suspended. However, the groundbreaking ceremony still took place a few months later, on 7 June 2014.

A report published in Turkish newspaper Cumhuriyet in February 2018 claimed that more than 400 workers had been killed during the construction of the airport, with accidents killing three to four workers every week, and families of the killed workers being paid to remain silent about the incidents. Turkish daily Evrensel also alleged that fatal accidents continued to occur. This prompted opposition MP Veli Ağbaba to submit a written questionnaire to the Turkish parliament on 13 February 2018. In response, the Turkish Ministry of Labour and Social Security claimed that there were only 27 fatalities during the construction of the airport. In October 2019, UK publications Construction News and Architects' Journal published a joint investigation into fatalities at the airport, nicknamed by workers "the cemetery" as so many have died. By this point, the official death toll had risen to 55, but unofficial estimates suggested that the figure could be "higher than 400".

Mass worker protests broke out on 14 September 2018 after a bus carrying workers crashed, injuring 17. Complaints by workers included poor living conditions in "vermin-infested dormitories", issues in transportation that had left them stranded under the rain or on site during holidays, and long delays in payments, among others.

Operations 

The opening ceremony took place on 29 October 2018, scheduled so as to coincide with the 95th anniversary of the proclamation of the Turkish Republic. The airport had been unofficially known as 'Istanbul New Airport' during construction - the new official name of 'Istanbul Airport' was announced at the opening ceremony. The first flight from the airport was Turkish Airlines flight TK2124 to the Turkish capital Ankara on 31 October 2018. On 1 November 2018, five daily flights began to arrive and depart from the airport: from Ankara, Antalya, Baku, North Nicosia, and İzmir, followed by Adana and Trabzon starting in December.

Before the full transfer, all flights were operated exclusively by Turkish Airlines. Regularly scheduled flights to all of the new airport's destinations continued to depart from Atatürk and Sabiha Gökçen airports alongside these trial flights. It was originally planned that on 31 December 2018, all equipment from Atatürk Airport would be transferred to the new airport via the O-7 Motorway. As of 17 January 2019, the transfer phase was set to start 1 March 2019. However, on 25 February, the transfer phase was moved a fourth time to 5 April 2019.

The full transfer of all scheduled commercial passenger flights from Atatürk Airport to the new Istanbul Airport took place on 6 April 2019 between 02:00 and 14:00. Hundreds of trucks carried more than 10,000 pieces of equipment, each weighing about 44 tons were moved to the new airport over 41 hours. Atatürk Airport's IATA code IST was also transferred to the new airport.

In February 2022, Turkish Cargo relocated all cargo flights and operations from their former base at Atatürk Airport to the new airport.

Facilities 

The airport currently has one terminal in service for domestic and international flights and five runways (three main and two backups) that are currently in operation. All runway surfaces are asphalt.

Concourses 
The airport features a total of five concourses lettered A, B, D, F, and G with a total of 143 passenger boarding bridges. Concourse G, which is located in the southeast, is reserved solely for domestic flights. Three passenger boarding bridges of Concourse F which is directly to the north of Concourse G have also been allocated for domestic flights. Concourses A, B, D, and F are used for international flights. The C and E concourses connect directly to the main terminal and are therefore not independent concourses.

Security 
3,500 security personnel and a total of 1,850 police, including 750 immigration officers, provide the airport's security. The site's perimeter is protected using ground radar, fixed CCTV cameras every 60 meters, pan–tilt–zoom cameras every , thermal cameras and fiber optic sensors every . The active terminal building uses up to 9,000 CCTV cameras.

Airlines and destinations

Passenger

The following airlines operate regular scheduled and charter flights at Istanbul Airport:

Cargo

Statistics
Below is the passenger data and development for Istanbul Airport for the years 2018–2022:

Ground transport

The airport is serviced from the city by public İETT and Havaist buses.

Mainline railway will connect the airport to Halkalı, and via outer city bypass running over the Yavuz Sultan Selim Bridge across the Bosporus and connecting with the Asian rail network at Gebze.

Taxi
Istanbul city taxis are available 24 hours a day outside the arrival and departure areas of the airport. A trip to Istanbul city centre by taxi takes approximately 40 minutes.

Metro
The M11 metro line was opened on 22 January 2023, with initial operations running to Kağıthane, skipping the Terminal 2 station. Extensions to Halkalı on the Marmaray rail line and Gayrettepe are under construction.

Layout

See also
Istanbul Canal
Yavuz Sultan Selim Bridge
Northern Marmara Motorway
Çanakkale 1915 Bridge
Atatürk Airport
Istanbul Sabiha Gökçen Airport

References

External links 

 
 Project plan

Build–operate–transfer
Buildings and structures in Istanbul Province
Transport infrastructure under construction in Turkey
Airports in Istanbul
2018 establishments in Turkey
Airports established in 2018